Pre-mRNA-splicing factor SPF27 is a protein that in humans is encoded by the BCAS2 gene.

References

Further reading

External links